Birch Tree in a Storm (Norwegian - Bjerk i storm) is an 1849 oil painting by the Norwegian artist Johan Christian Dahl, measuring 92 by 72 cm. It is owned by the Bergen Billedgalleri, now part of the KODE in Bergen. It shows a tree seen by the artist during a descent into Måbøgaldene on the way to Eidfjord.

Sources

1849 paintings
Paintings by Johan Christian Dahl
Paintings in Bergen